Gary Nicholson may refer to:

Gary Nicholson (footballer) (born 1960), English professional footballer
Gary Nicholson (singer), American singer-songwriter